This list contains all cultural property of national significance (class A) in the canton of Fribourg from the 2009 Swiss Inventory of Cultural Property of National and Regional Significance. It is sorted by municipality and contains 205 individual buildings, 14 collections, 18 archaeological finds and 1 other special site or object.

The geographic coordinates provided are in the Swiss coordinate system as given in the Inventory.

: Top - A B C D E F G H K L M O P R S T U V W

Attalens

Bas-Intyamon

Belfaux

Belmont-Broye

Bois-d'Amont

Bösingen

Bossonnens

Broc

Bulle

Châbles

Châtel-Saint-Denis

Châtel-sur-Montsalvens

Châtillon

Cheiry

Corbières

Corminboeuf

Cottens

Courtepin

Cressier

Cugy

Delley-Portalban

Düdingen

Echarlens

Estavayer

Fribourg

Gibloux

Givisiez

Grandvillard

Granges-Paccot

Greng

Gruyères

Hauterive

Hauteville

Haut-Intyamon

Heitenried

Jaun

Kerzers

La Roche

La Verrerie

Le Mouret

Les Montets

Marsens

Massonnens

Mézières

Montagny

Mont-Vully

Muntelier

Murten

Pierrafortscha

Plaffeien

Pont-en-Ogoz

Riaz

Romont

Rue

Sâles

Schmitten

Sévaz

Siviriez

St. Ursen

Surpierre

Tafers

Torny

Treyvaux

Ursy

Val-de-Charmey

Vallon

Villarsel-sur-Marly

Villars-sur-Glâne

Villarvolard

Villorsonnens

Vuisternens-devant-Romont

Wünnewil-Flamatt

References
 All entries, addresses and coordinates are from:

External links
 Swiss Inventory of Cultural Property of National and Regional Significance, 2009 edition:
PDF documents: Class A objects
PDF documents: Class B objects
Geographic information system